The Bicentennial Bowl was a postseason college football bowl game played after the 1975 and 1976 regular seasons. Each game was held at a different venue; the first game in Little Rock, Arkansas, and the second game in Richmond, Virginia. The bowl's name came from the United States Bicentennial. Results are listed in NCAA records, but the games were not considered NCAA-sanctioned bowls.

The 1975 game matched teams from the Arkansas Intercollegiate Conference and Oklahoma Intercollegiate Conference, and was considered an NAIA "special event." The 1976 game matched teams from the Central Intercollegiate Athletic Association and the Mid-Eastern Athletic Conference.

Game results

MVPs
1975: Willie Guient (TE, East Central) and Johnny Gross (DT, Henderson State)
1976: Ricky Anderson (FB, South Carolina State) and Jerry Curry (RG, Norfolk State)

Notes
 The Ouachita Baptist Tigers opted not to participate in the 1975 game, in hopes of playing in the 1975 NAIA postseason.
 The 1976 game had originally been planned for December 4, in Charlotte, North Carolina.

See also
 List of college bowl games

References

Defunct college football bowls